Mad Cave Studios (also known simply as Mad Cave) is an independent comic book publisher based out of Miami, Florida; it was established in 2014. Mad Cave has published a range of comic books and trade paperbacks which are being distributed by Diamond Comic Distributors.

Overview 
The publisher was founded in 2014 by Mark London. In February 2018, Mad Cave published the first issue of its flagship title, Battlecats. It released a second series, Midnight Task Force that July. In November 2018, Mad Cave Studios released the first issue of Knights of the Golden Sun. Their fourth title Honor and Curse launched in February 2019.

Digital versions of their comics are available at ComiXology and Drive Thru Comics.

Talent Search
In 2018 Mad Cave ran a Talent Search for new comic book writers and artists. Finalists worked on comic books for Mad Cave. The comic book Show's End was the first title to feature work from the 2018 Talent Search winners, launching in August 2019. The Talent Search was run again in 2019 for both writers and artists.

The third Talent Search from June 1-September 1, 2020. Six winners had their work published in an anthology comic book. In September they announced a young adult graphic novel imprint called Maverick to debut in the fall of 2021.

Titles

Battlecats
Battlecats, set in a medieval fantasy venue, concerns a war between the noble Battlecats and the forces of the Dire Beast. It is written by Mark London with art by Michael Camelo and Julian Gonzalez. A Trade Paperback collection of the first volume was released in July 2018. A second volume began in May 2019. A spinoff anthology Battlecats: Tales of Valderia launched in February 2020 with various creators exploring the history of the Battlecats world.

Reception of the series has been mixed. Reviewing the inaugural issue, Christina Williams of On Comics Ground was impressed by the art and praised the writings balance between dialogue and action, whereas Joshua Davidson of Bleeding Cool News called the issue an "underwhelming" debut from the new publisher.

Midnight Task Force
Midnight Task Force is a cyberpunk comic set in the year 2055. Schizophrenic detective Aiden attempts to solve a series of murders in Detroit while also striving to conceal his condition. The series is written by Mark London and illustrated by Alejandro Girlado. A trade paperback collection of the first volume was released in July 2019.

Knights of the Golden Sun
This Biblically-based title concerns about a battle between archangels and fallen angels which takes place between the Old and New Testaments. It is written by Mark London and illustrated by Mauricio Villareal. It was the first Mad Cave comic to get a second printing. The title returned in December 2020 with #8 of the series, created by the same team.

Honor and Curse
This is a Martial arts comic book taking place feudal Japan. It is written by Mark London and illustrated by Nicolás Salamanca. The first issue was released in February 2019 and the series ran for six issues. The first two issues sold out completely at the distributor level and both issues received second printings. The title returned in January, 2021 with #7 of the series created by the same team.

Show's End
A horror comic book set in the 1920s against the background of a travelling carnival, Show's End is written by Anthony Cleveland and illustrated by Jeferson Sadzinski. It debuted in August 2019.

WolvenHeart
Thie series concerns Sterling Cross, a monster-hunting time traveler from the 19t century who works for the eponymous WolvenHeart organization. This began in October 2019. Writer Mark London and illustrator Alejandro Girlado re-teamed after having worked on the earlier Midnight Task Force.

V9
This is a science fiction action comic following the assassin Velveteen as she battles against the Order of the 9 in the year 2055. Written by Ben Goldsmith and art by Travis Mercer, the series debuted in November 2019.

Over the Ropes
This is set in a fictional 1990s wrestling league. It was initially released for Local Comic Shop Day in November 2019, before the wider release of #1 in December 2019.

Savage Bastards
This is a Western comic set in the 1870s. It is written by David Galiano and illustrated by Carlos Angeli. The first issue was released in February 2020

Hellfighter Quin
This is a fantasy action series following Quinlan Jones, the masked vigilante of Harlem who is forced into a multidimensional fighting contest for control of the Azure Sun artifact. It is scripted by Jay Sandlin and illustrated by Atagun Ilhan. The first issue was released in March 2020.

Stargazer
This title is a science fiction drama series centering around a quartet of characters who were abducted by aliens as children, and then twenty years later have to deal with the return of aliens to Earth. It is written by Anthony Cleveland and drawn by Antonio Fuso. Originally planned for spring 2020, the series was delayed by the by the COVID-19 pandemic and so debuted in September, 2020. The first issue sold out at distributor level and received a second printing limited to 1,000 copies.

Dry Foot
This is a coming of age story set in 1980s Miami. Here, four teens plan to escape the drugs and violence of the city by planning a heist on the city's most dangerous gang. It is written by Jarred Lujan with art from Orlando Caicedo. As with Stargazer, this series' debut was planned for spring 2020 but delayed by the COVID-19 pandemic and debuted in September, 2020. The first issue sold out at distributor level and received a second printing limited to 1,000 copies.

Trade paperback collections
 Battlecats Volume 1: The Hunt for The Dire Beast (reprints Battlecats Vol. 1 #1–5) 2018
 Battlecats Volume 2: Fallen Legacy (reprints Battlecats Vol. 2 #1–6) 2019
 Battlecats: Tales of Valderia (reprints Battlecats: Tales of Valderia #1-4 and Battlecats Halloween Fest 2019) 2020
 Dry Foot (reprints Dry Foot #1-4) 2021
 Hellfighter Quin (reprints Hellfighter Quin #1-5) 2020
 Honor and Curse Volume 1: Torn (reprints Honor and Curse #1–6) 2019
 Knights of the Golden Sun Volume 1: Providence Lost (reprints Knights of the Golden Sun #1–7) 2019
 Midnight Task Force Volume 1: Hidden Voices (reprints Midnight Task Force #1–4) 2019
 Over the Ropes (reprints Over the Ropes #1-5) 2020
 RV9 (reprints  RV9 #1-5) 2020
 Savage Bastards (reprints Savage Bastards #1-5,  2020
 Show's End (reprints Show's End #1–5) 2020
 WolvenHeart Volume 1: Legendary Slayer (reprints WolvenHeart'' #1-7) 2020

References

External links 
Official Website
Mad Cave Studios YouTube channel

Book publishing companies based in Florida
Comic book publishing companies of the United States
2014 establishments in Florida
American companies established in 2014